Joseph Christopher McKenna (born August 3, 1995 in Towaco, New Jersey) is an American freestyle wrestler and graduated folkstyle wrestler who competes internationally at 65 kilograms and formerly competed collegiately at 141 pounds. In freestyle, he is a two-time and reigning Pan American Continental champion, claimed a bronze medal from the 2017 U23 World Championships, was the 2018 US Open National Champion (medalist at '20 and '19 US Senior Nationals), the runner–up at the 2020 US Olympic Team Trials and 2021 US World Team Trials and was also the 2014 Junior World Championship runner–up. As a folkstyle wrestler, he was a three–time NCAA Division I All-American (runner–up in 2019), two–time Big Ten Conference champion and two–time Pac-12 Conference champion for the Ohio State Buckeyes (two–time AA and two–time B1G champion) and the Stanford Cardinal (AA and two–time Pac-12 Conference champion).

Folkstyle career

High school 
McKenna attended Blair Academy, noted for its wrestling program, in his native New Jersey. During his time as a high schooler, he went on to rack up three Prep National titles while claiming multiple titles from prestigious tournaments such as the Beast of the East and Ironman. McKenna was the team captain during his last two years. He also competed at Who's Number One in 2013, falling to eventual Penn State great Jason Nolf. Going into his junior year (November 2013), McKenna committed to the Stanford Cardinal.

College

Stanford University 
After redshirting during the 2014–15 season, McKenna posted big success during his freshman year, going 19–2 during regular season with top–ranked Dean Heil being the only to beat him during this period of time. The second–ranked wrestler in the country, McKenna claimed the Pac-12 Conference title and placed third at the NCAAs, only losing to Bryce Meredith in the latter and bouncing back to beat Anthony Ashnault in his last match of the season. After the season, McKenna was named the Pac-12 Freshman of the Year.

As a sophomore (2016–17), McKenna posted an outstanding 26–1 record during regular season, and after claiming his second straight conference title, he was upset and failed to place at the NCAAs.

The Ohio State University 
After the previous season, McKenna transferred from the Stanford University to the Ohio State University. During his first season as a Buckeye (2016–17), he went 12–1 during regular season, claimed the prestigious Big Ten Conference title and placed third at the NCAAs, notably defeating MAC Conference champion from Missouri Jaydin Eierman in the third–place match. In his senior year, McKenna had yet another successful regular season, claiming the Cliff Keen title and racking up a 16–2 record, before claiming his second straight B1G title and placing as the runner–up at the NCAA tournament, in his best season during college. Overall, McKenna racked up a 105–11 record in two seasons for the Buckeyes and two seasons for the Cardinal.

Freestyle career

2014–2016 
After a second–place finish at the Junior World Championships, McKenna made his senior freestyle debut in November 2014 at the age of 19, placing fourth at the Bill Farrell Memorial International. Afterwards, he placed third at the Brazil Cup, notably defeating future U23 World Champion from Russia Nachyn Kuular in the first round. McKenna competed in multiple tournaments throughout 2015, but only placed at the 2015 Granma y Cerro Pelado, claiming the gold medal. In 2016, he only competed at the Polish Open, placing third.

2017–2019 
After placing third at the 2017 Ion Cornianu & Ladislau Simon tournament in Romania, he made the US U23 World Team and went on to claim a bronze medal from the U23 World Championships. In 2018, he started off by claiming the US Open National Championship, defeating Jaydin Eierman after tech'ing his way to the finals. Due to his last result, McKenna sat out in the finals of the US World Team Trials, in where he was defeated twice in a row by '16 World Champion (61kg) and four–time NCAA champion for the Buckeyes Logan Stieber. To finish the year, he was defeated by three–time World Champion (61kg) from Azerbaijan Haji Aliyev at the prestigious Alexandr Medved Memorial International. In 2019, McKenna failed to qualify for the US World Team Trials, but qualified for the 2020 US Olympic Team Trials after a second–place finish at the US Senior Nationals.

2020–2021 
McKenna opened up the year with a seventh–place finish at the prestigious Matteo Pellicone and a ninth–place finish Golden Grand Prix Ivan Yarygin. He was then scheduled to compete at the US Olympic Team Trials, however, the event was postponed as well as the 2020 Summer Olympics due to the COVID-19 pandemic. After months of being unable to compete due to the pandemic, McKenna placed third at the US National Championships, going 7–1. To open up 2021, McKenna competed in back–to–back FloWrestling events, dominating NCAA champions Nahshon Garrett and Seth Gross. McKenna went back to competing overseas, first competing at the Ukraine Open, where he notably defeated '20 European Continental finalist from Belarus Niurgun Skriabin before falling to reigning U23 World Champion from Azerbaijan Turan Bayramov, failing to place. Next, he competed at the prestigious Matteo Pellicone Ranking Series, placing third.

McKenna then competed at the rescheduled US Olympic Team Trials in April 2–3, as the fifth seed, in an attempt of representing the United States at the 2020 Summer Olympics. McKenna performed outstandingly on his way to the finals, upseting fourth–seeded and '17 World Championship runner–up (70kg) James Green and top–seeded and defending US World Team Member Zain Retherford. In the best–of–three finale, he was defeated by '19 US National champion Jordan Oliver twice in a row, earning hard–fought runner–up honors.

As the other US Olympic Trials finalist, McKenna competed at the Pan American Continental Championships from May 27 to 30, replacing an injured Oliver. He captured the crown after tech'ing all of his four opponents, most notably four–time All–American for Rutgers and representative of Puerto Rico Sebastian Rivera, helping the USA reach all ten medals in freestyle. In a quick turnaround, McKenna competed at the prestigioys Poland Open on June 9. After a victory over a Ukrainian opponent, McKenna suffered back–to–back losses that came in hand of the highly accomplished Vasyl Shuptar and Yianni Diakomihalis, before earning a forfeit win over Shuptar to claim the bronze.

McKenna competed at the 2021 US World Team Trials on September 11–12, intending to represent the country at the World Championships. After a back-and-forth win over Evan Henderson to make the finals, McKenna beat rival Yianni Diakomihalis in another slugfest, before being downed twice convincingly, losing the series.

2022 
To start off the year, McKenna placed fifth at the prestigious Golden Grand Prix Ivan Yarygin, notably downing two-time World medalist Akhmed Chakaev from January 27 to 30. He then beat Kamal Begakov on February 12, at Bout at the Ballpark. McKenna competed at the prestigious Yasar Dogu International on February 27, claiming a bronze medal after going 4–|, only losing to World Champion Zagir Shakhiev in a close bout.

On May 8, McKenna defended his Pan American championship in Acapulco, Mexico, defeating Olympian Agustín Destribats and four-time All-American Sebastian Rivera in order to do so.

Freestyle record 

! colspan="7"| Senior Freestyle Matches
|-
!  Res.
!  Record
!  Opponent
!  Score
!  Date
!  Event
!  Location
|-
! style=background:white colspan=7 |
|-
|Win
|83–40
|align=left| Krzysztof Bienkowski
|style="font-size:88%"|3–1
|style="font-size:88%" rowspan=4|July 20, 2022
|style="font-size:88%" rowspan=4|2022 Poland Open
|style="text-align:left;font-size:88%;" rowspan=4|
 Warsaw, Poland
|-
|Loss
|82–40
|align=left| Tsogbadrakh Tseveensuren
|style="font-size:88%"|1–2
|-
|Win
|82–39
|align=left| Nino Leutert
|style="font-size:88%"|9–2
|-
|Win
|81–39
|align=left| Vasyl Shuptar
|style="font-size:88%"|TF 10–0
|-
! style=background:white colspan=7 |
|-
|Win
|80–39
|align=left| Ian Parker
|style="font-size:88%"|TF 11–0
|style="font-size:88%" rowspan=5|May 21, 2022
|style="font-size:88%" rowspan=5|2022 US World Team Trials Challenge
|style="text-align:left;font-size:88%;" rowspan=5| Coralville, Iowa
|-
|Win
|79–39
|align=left| Nick Lee
|style="font-size:88%"|TF 13–3
|-
|Win
|79–39
|align=left| Pat Lugo
|style="font-size:88%"|TF 10–0
|-
|Win
|78–39
|align=left| Josh Saunders
|style="font-size:88%"|TF 10–0
|-
|Loss
|77–39
|align=left| Ian Parker
|style="font-size:88%"|5–8
|-
! style=background:white colspan=7 |
|-
|Win
|77–38
|align=left| Sebastian Rivera
|style="font-size:88%"|TF 10–0
|style="font-size:88%" rowspan=3|May 8, 2022
|style="font-size:88%" rowspan=3|2022 Pan American Continental Championships
|style="text-align:left;font-size:88%;" rowspan=3| Acapulco, Mexico
|-
|Win
|76–38
|align=left| Agustín Destribats
|style="font-size:88%"|13–5
|-
|Win
|75–38
|align=left| Andre Quispe
|style="font-size:88%"|TF 10–0
|-
! style=background:white colspan=7 |
|-
|Win
|
|align=left| Ikromzhon Khadzhimurodov
|style="font-size:88%"|INJ
|style="font-size:88%" rowspan=5|February 27, 2022
|style="font-size:88%" rowspan=5|2022 Yasar Dogu International
|style="text-align:left;font-size:88%;" rowspan=5|
 Istanbul, Turkey
|-
|Win
|74–38
|align=left| Nikolay Okhlopkov
|style="font-size:88%"|Fall
|-
|Loss
|73–38
|align=left| Zagir Shakhiev
|style="font-size:88%"|9–11
|-
|Win
|73–37
|align=left| Evan Henderson
|style="font-size:88%"|17–9
|-
|Win
|72–37
|align=left| Bekzat Yermekbay
|style="font-size:88%"|TF 15–4
|-
|Win
|71–37
|align=left| Kamal Begakov
|style="font-size:88%"|TF 10–0
|style="font-size:88%"|February 12, 2022
|style="font-size:88%"|2022 Bout at the Ballpark
|style="text-align:left;font-size:88%;"|
 Arlington, Texas
|-
! style=background:white colspan=7 | 
|-
|Loss
|70–37
|align=left| Ibragim Ibragimov
|style="font-size:88%"|4–6
|style="font-size:88%" rowspan=5|January 27–30, 2022
|style="font-size:88%" rowspan=5|Golden Grand Prix Ivan Yarygin 2022
|style="text-align:left;font-size:88%;" rowspan=5|
 Krasnoyarsk, Russia
|-
|Win
|70–36
|align=left| Akhmed Chakaev
|style="font-size:88%"|10–8
|-
|Win
|69–36
|align=left| Ibragim Abutalimov
|style="font-size:88%"|TF 10–0
|-
|Loss
|68–36
|align=left| Ramazan Ferzaliev
|style="font-size:88%"|1–6
|-
|Win
|68–35
|align=left| Uladislau Koika
|style="font-size:88%"|TF
|-
! style=background:white colspan=7 |
|-
|Loss
|67–35
|align=left| Yianni Diakomihalis
|style="font-size:88%"|TF 2–12
|style="font-size:88%" rowspan=3|September 12, 2021
|style="font-size:88%" rowspan=4|2021 US World Team Trials
|style="text-align:left;font-size:88%;" rowspan=4| Lincoln, Nebraska
|-
|Loss
|67–34
|align=left| Yianni Diakomihalis
|style="font-size:88%"|2–5
|-
|Win
|67–33
|align=left| Yianni Diakomihalis
|style="font-size:88%"|8–7
|-
|Win
|66–33
|align=left| Evan Henderson
|style="font-size:88%"|10–9
|style="font-size:88%"|September 11, 2021
|-
! style=background:white colspan=7 |
|-
|Win
|
|align=left| Vasyl Shuptar
|style="font-size:88%"|FF
|style="font-size:88%" rowspan=4|June 9, 2021
|style="font-size:88%" rowspan=4|2021 Poland Open
|style="text-align:left;font-size:88%;" rowspan=4|
 Warsaw, Poland
|-
|Loss
|65–33
|align=left| Yianni Diakomihalis
|style="font-size:88%"|TF 4–15
|-
|Loss
|65–32
|align=left| Vasyl Shuptar
|style="font-size:88%"|4–6
|-
|Win
|65–31
|align=left| Andriy Svyryd
|style="font-size:88%"|8–0
|-
! style=background:white colspan=7 |
|-
|Win
|64–31
|align=left| Marcos de Brito
|style="font-size:88%"|TF 10–0
|style="font-size:88%" rowspan=4|May 30, 2021
|style="font-size:88%" rowspan=4|2021 Pan American Continental Championships
|style="text-align:left;font-size:88%;" rowspan=4|
 Guatemala City, Guatemala
|-
|Win
|63–31
|align=left| Sebastian Rivera
|style="font-size:88%"|TF 10–0
|-
|Win
|62–31
|align=left| Albaro Rudesindo Camacho
|style="font-size:88%"|TF 17–6
|-
|Win
|61–31
|align=left| Juan Rodriguez Jovel 
|style="font-size:88%"|TF 10–0
|-
! style=background:white colspan=7 |
|-
|Loss
|60–31
|align=left| Jordan Oliver
|style="font-size:88%"|2–5
|style="font-size:88%" rowspan=4|April 2–3, 2021
|style="font-size:88%" rowspan=4|2020 US Olympic Team Trials
|style="text-align:left;font-size:88%;" rowspan=4| Forth Worth, Texas
|-
|Loss
|60–30
|align=left| Jordan Oliver
|style="font-size:88%"|0–3
|-
|Win
|60–29
|align=left| Zain Retherford
|style="font-size:88%"|8–5
|-
|Win
|59–29
|align=left| James Green
|style="font-size:88%"|TF 12–1
|-
! style=background:white colspan=7 |
|-
|Win
|58–29
|align=left| Selim Kozan
|style="font-size:88%"|8–2
|style="font-size:88%" rowspan=3|March 6, 2021
|style="font-size:88%" rowspan=3|Matteo Pellicone Ranking Series 2021
|style="text-align:left;font-size:88%;" rowspan=3|
 Rome, Italy
|-
|Loss
|57–29
|align=left| Bajrang Punia
|style="font-size:88%"|3–6
|-
|Win
|57–28
|align=left| David Habat
|style="font-size:88%"|7–3
|-
! style=background:white colspan=7 | 
|-
|Loss
|56–28
|align=left| Turan Bayramov
|style="font-size:88%"|1–5
|style="font-size:88%" rowspan=3|February 26, 2021
|style="font-size:88%" rowspan=3|XXIV Outstanding Ukrainian Wrestlers and Coaches Memorial
|style="text-align:left;font-size:88%;" rowspan=3|
 Kyiv, Ukraine
|-
|Win
|56–27
|align=left| Niurgun Skriabin
|style="font-size:88%"|10–3
|-
|Win
|55–27
|align=left| Amar Laissaoui
|style="font-size:88%"|TF 12–2
|-
|Win
|54–27
|align=left| Seth Gross
|style="font-size:88%"|TF 10–0
|style="font-size:88%"|January 13, 2021
|style="font-size:88%"|FloWrestling: Burroughs vs. Taylor
|style="text-align:left;font-size:88%;" rowspan=2|
 Austin, Texas
|-
|Win
|53–27
|align=left| Nahshon Garrett
|style="font-size:88%"|TF 12–2
|style="font-size:88%"|January 9, 2021
|style="font-size:88%"|FloWrestling: Mensah-Stock vs. Gray
|-
! style=background:white colspan=7 |
|-
|Win
|52–27
|align=left| Yahya Thomas
|style="font-size:88%"|6–1
|style="font-size:88%" rowspan=8|October 10–11, 2020
|style="font-size:88%" rowspan=8|2020 US Senior Nationals
|style="text-align:left;font-size:88%;" rowspan=8|
 Coralville, Iowa
|-
|Win
|51–27
|align=left| Jaydin Eierman
|style="font-size:88%"|TF 10–0
|-
|Win
|50–27
|align=left| Nick Dardanes
|style="font-size:88%"|8–2
|-
|Win
|49–27
|align=left| Chad Red
|style="font-size:88%"|TF 14–4
|-
|Loss
|48–27
|align=left| Andrew Alirez
|style="font-size:88%"|4–6
|-
|Win
|48–26
|align=left| Jaden Abas
|style="font-size:88%"|TF 10–0
|-
|Win
|47–26
|align=left| Kevon Davenport
|style="font-size:88%"|TF 11–0
|-
|Win
|46–26
|align=left| Caleb Craig
|style="font-size:88%"|TF 10–0
|-
|Loss
|45–26
|align=left| Tyler Berger
|style="font-size:88%"|2–8
|style="font-size:88%"|August 30, 2020
|style="font-size:88%"|Chael Sonnen's Wrestling Underground I
|style="text-align:left;font-size:88%;"|
 United States
|-
! style=background:white colspan=7 | 
|-
|Loss
|45–25
|align=left| Dasha Sharastepanov
|style="font-size:88%"|2–4
|style="font-size:88%" rowspan=3|January 23–26, 2020
|style="font-size:88%" rowspan=3|Golden Grand Prix Ivan Yarygin 2020
|style="text-align:left;font-size:88%;" rowspan=3|
 Krasnoyarsk, Russia
|-
|Win
|45–24
|align=left| Tulga Tumur
|style="font-size:88%"|4–3
|-
|Win
|44–24
|align=left| Muslim Saidulaev
|style="font-size:88%"|5–2
|-
! style=background:white colspan=7 | 
|-
|Loss
|43–24
|align=left| Zain Retherford
|style="font-size:88%"|5–10
|style="font-size:88%" rowspan=3|January 15–18, 2020
|style="font-size:88%" rowspan=3|Matteo Pellicone Ranking Series 2020
|style="text-align:left;font-size:88%;" rowspan=3|
 Rome, Italy
|-
|Loss
|43–23
|align=left| Bajrang Punia
|style="font-size:88%"|2–4
|-
|Win
|43–22
|align=left| Abdellatif Mansour
|style="font-size:88%"|TF 12–2
|-
! style=background:white colspan=7 | 
|-
|Loss
|42–22
|align=left| Jordan Oliver
|style="font-size:88%"|TF 0–10
|style="font-size:88%" rowspan=5|December 20–22, 2019
|style="font-size:88%" rowspan=5|2019 Senior Nationals - US Olympic Trials Qualifier
|style="text-align:left;font-size:88%;" rowspan=5|
 Forth Worth, Texas
|-
|Win
|42–21
|align=left| Yianni Diakomihalis
|style="font-size:88%"|6–5
|-
|Win
|41–21
|align=left| Evan Henderson
|style="font-size:88%"|TF 11–1
|-
|Win
|40–21
|align=left| Jayson Ness
|style="font-size:88%"|8–2
|-
|Win
|39–21
|align=left| Rob Mathers
|style="font-size:88%"|TF 10–0
|-
! style=background:white colspan=7 | 
|-
|Loss
|38–21
|align=left| Evan Henderson
|style="font-size:88%"|12–14
|style="font-size:88%" rowspan=6|November 15–16, 2019
|style="font-size:88%" rowspan=6|2019 Bill Farrell Memorial International Open
|style="text-align:left;font-size:88%;" rowspan=6|
 New York City, New York
|-
|Win
|38–20
|align=left| Ben Whitford
|style="font-size:88%"|TF 10-0
|-
|Loss
|37–20
|align=left| Jordan Oliver
|style="font-size:88%"|3–5
|-
|Win
|37–19
|align=left| Dean Heil
|style="font-size:88%"|TF 10-0
|-
|Win
|36–19
|align=left| Byambasuren Uuganbayar
|style="font-size:88%"|TF 11–0
|-
|Win
|35–19
|align=left| Mario Mason
|style="font-size:88%"|4–0
|-
! style=background:white colspan=7 |
|-
|Loss
|34–19
|align=left| Dean Heil
|style="font-size:88%"|2–5
|style="font-size:88%" rowspan=3|May 3, 2019
|style="font-size:88%" rowspan=3|2019 US Senior Last Chance World Team Trials Qualifier
|style="text-align:left;font-size:88%;" rowspan=3|
 East Stroudsburg, Pennsylvania
|-
|Win
|34–18
|align=left| Evan Henderson
|style="font-size:88%"|10–6
|-
|Win
|33–18
|align=left| Jake Jones
|style="font-size:88%"|TF 11–0
|-
! style=background:white colspan=7 |
|-
|Loss
|32–18
|align=left| Frank Molinaro
|style="font-size:88%"|3–6
|style="font-size:88%" rowspan=5|April 24–27, 2019
|style="font-size:88%" rowspan=5|2019 US Open National Championships
|style="text-align:left;font-size:88%;" rowspan=5|
 Las Vegas, Nevada
|-
|Win
|32–17
|align=left| Bryce Meredith
|style="font-size:88%"|TF 10–0
|-
|Win
|31–17
|align=left| Ben Freeman
|style="font-size:88%"|TF 10–0
|-
|Loss
|30–17
|align=left| Dean Heil
|style="font-size:88%"|9–12
|-
|Win
|30–16
|align=left| Chris Deloza
|style="font-size:88%"|TF 10–0
|-
! style=background:white colspan=7 |
|-
|Loss
|29–16
|align=left| Haji Aliyev
|style="font-size:88%"|TF 0–10
|style="font-size:88%" |September 14–16, 2018
|style="font-size:88%" |2018 Alexander Medved Prizes
|style="text-align:left;font-size:88%;" |
 Minsk, Belarus
|-
! style=background:white colspan=7 |
|-
|Loss
|29–15
|align=left| Logan Stieber
|style="font-size:88%"|0–8
|style="font-size:88%" rowspan=2|June 15–16, 2018
|style="font-size:88%" rowspan=2|2018 Final X: State College
|style="text-align:left;font-size:88%;" rowspan=2|
 State College, Pennsylvania
|-
|Loss
|29–14
|align=left| Logan Stieber
|style="font-size:88%"|8–8
|-
! style=background:white colspan=7 | 
|-
|Win
|29–13
|align=left| Jaydin Eierman
|style="font-size:88%"|7–3
|style="font-size:88%" rowspan=5|April 24–28, 2018
|style="font-size:88%" rowspan=5|2018 US Open National Championships
|style="text-align:left;font-size:88%;" rowspan=5|
 Las Vegas, Nevada
|-
|Win
|28–13
|align=left| Evan Henderson
|style="font-size:88%"|TF 10–0
|-
|Win
|27–13
|align=left| Robbie Mathers
|style="font-size:88%"|TF 11-0
|-
|Win
|26–13
|align=left| Darren Wynn
|style="font-size:88%"|TF 12–0
|-
|Win
|25–13
|align=left| Darick Lapaglia
|style="font-size:88%"|TF 10–0
|-
! style=background:white colspan=7 |
|-
|Win
|24–13
|align=left| Heorhi Kaliyeu
|style="font-size:88%"|2–0
|style="font-size:88%" rowspan=5|November 21–26, 2017
|style="font-size:88%" rowspan=5|2017 U23 World Wrestling Championships
|style="text-align:left;font-size:88%;" rowspan=5|
 Bydgoszcz, Poland
|-
|Win
|23–13
|align=left| Tulga Tumur Ochir
|style="font-size:88%"|6–1
|-
|Win
|22–13
|align=left| Maxim Saculțan
|style="font-size:88%"|9–6
|-
|Loss
|21–13
|align=left| Nachyn Kuular
|style="font-size:88%"|TF 0–10
|-
|Win
|21–12
|align=left| Patryk Olenczyn
|style="font-size:88%"|TF 11–0
|-
! style=background:white colspan=7 |
|-
|Win
|20–12
|align=left| Boo Lewallen
|style="font-size:88%"|8–4
|style="font-size:88%" rowspan=4|October 7–8, 2017
|style="font-size:88%" rowspan=4|2017 US U23 World Team Trials
|style="text-align:left;font-size:88%;" rowspan=4|
 Rochester, Minnesota
|-
|Win
|19–12
|align=left| Boo Lewallen
|style="font-size:88%"|5–1
|-
|Win
|18–12
|align=left| Brock Zacherl
|style="font-size:88%"|3–2
|-
|Win
|17–12
|align=left| Dylan Thurston
|style="font-size:88%"|TF 10–0
|-
! style=background:white colspan=7 |
|-
|Win
|16–12
|align=left| Haydar Yavuz 
|style="font-size:88%"|8–2
|style="font-size:88%" rowspan=4|July 21–23, 2017
|style="font-size:88%" rowspan=4|2017 Ion Cornianu & Ladislau Simon Memorial
|style="text-align:left;font-size:88%;" rowspan=4|
 Bucharest, Romania
|-
|Win
|15–12
|align=left| Kilicsallayah Selahattin
|style="font-size:88%"|5–3
|-
|Loss
|14–12
|align=left| BJ Futrell
|style="font-size:88%"|0–6
|-
|Win
|14–11
|align=left| Maxim Saculțan
|style="font-size:88%"|9–2
|-
! style=background:white colspan=7 |
|-
|Win
|14311
|align=left| Masakazu Kamoi 
|style="font-size:88%"|5–4
|style="font-size:88%" rowspan=3|June 17–19, 2016
|style="font-size:88%" rowspan=3|2016 Poland Open, Ziolkowski & Pytlasinski Memorial International
|style="text-align:left;font-size:88%;" rowspan=3|
 Spala, Poland
|-
|Loss
|12–11
|align=left| Katai Yeerianbieke
|style="font-size:88%"|2–8
|-
|Win
|12–10
|align=left| Mateuz Nejman
|style="font-size:88%"|Fall
|-
! style=background:white colspan=7 |
|-
|Loss
|11–10
|align=left| Jordan Oliver
|style="font-size:88%"|TF 0–10
|style="font-size:88%"|June 14–15, 2015
|style="font-size:88%"|2015 US World Team Trials Challenge
|style="text-align:left;font-size:88%;"|
 Madison, Wisconsin
|-
! style=background:white colspan=7 |
|-
|Loss
|11–9
|align=left| Coleman Scott
|style="font-size:88%"|TF 0–10
|style="font-size:88%" rowspan=4|May 7–9, 2015
|style="font-size:88%" rowspan=4|2015 US Senior National Championships
|style="text-align:left;font-size:88%;" rowspan=4|
 Las Vegas, Nevada
|-
|Loss
|11–8
|align=left| Daniel Dennis
|style="font-size:88%"|4–6
|-
|Win
|11–7
|align=left| Pat Garcia
|style="font-size:88%"|TF 12–2
|-
|Win
|10–7
|align=left| Curtis Hulstine
|style="font-size:88%"|TF 10–0
|-
! style=background:white colspan=7 |
|-
|Loss
|9–7
|align=left| Ruslan Mammadov
|style="font-size:88%"|0–7
|style="font-size:88%" rowspan=2|March 5–7, 2015
|style="font-size:88%" rowspan=2|2015 Alexander Medved Prizes
|style="text-align:left;font-size:88%;" rowspan=2|
 Minsk, Belarus
|-
|Win
|9–6
|align=left| Shota Phartenadze
|style="font-size:88%"|10–2
|-
! style=background:white colspan=7 |
|-
|Win
|8–6
|align=left| Dabian Quintana
|style="font-size:88%"|8–5
|style="font-size:88%" rowspan=3|February 11–15, 2015
|style="font-size:88%" rowspan=3|2015 Granma y Cerro Pelado International
|style="text-align:left;font-size:88%;" rowspan=3|
 Havana, Cuba
|-
|Loss
|7–6
|align=left| Yowlys Bonne
|style="font-size:88%"|TF 6–18
|-
|Win
|7–5
|align=left| Maikel Perez
|style="font-size:88%"|9–5
|-
! style=background:white colspan=7 |
|-
|Loss
|6–5
|align=left| Yo Nakata
|style="font-size:88%"|2–3
|style="font-size:88%" rowspan=3|January 28–31, 2015
|style="font-size:88%" rowspan=3|2015 Dave Schultz Memorial International
|style="text-align:left;font-size:88%;" rowspan=3|
 Colorado Springs, Colorado
|-
|Loss
|6–4
|align=left| Bajrang Punia
|style="font-size:88%"|2–3
|-
|Win
|6–3
|align=left| Jim Gauntlett
|style="font-size:88%"|TF 10–0
|-
! style=background:white colspan=7 |
|-
|Win
|5–3
|align=left| Juliano Carvalho
|style="font-size:88%"|TF 14–3
|style="font-size:88%" rowspan=3|November 28–30, 2014
|style="font-size:88%" rowspan=3|2014 Copa Brasil
|style="text-align:left;font-size:88%;" rowspan=3|
 Rio de Janeiro, Brazil
|-
|Loss
|4–3
|align=left| Yo Nakata
|style="font-size:88%"|2–3
|-
|Win
|4–2
|align=left| Nachyn Kuular
|style="font-size:88%"|11–8
|-
! style=background:white colspan=7 |
|-
|Loss
|3–2
|align=left| Shikhsaid Dzhalilov
|style="font-size:88%"|2–5
|style="font-size:88%" rowspan=6|November 7–9, 2014
|style="font-size:88%" rowspan=6|2014 Bill Farrell Memorial International
|style="text-align:left;font-size:88%;" rowspan=6|
 New York City, New York
|-
|Win
|
|align=left| Reece Humphrey
|style="font-size:88%"|INJ
|-
|Win
|3–1
|align=left| Steven Pami
|style="font-size:88%"|11–6
|-
|Win
|2–1
|align=left| Brett Robbins
|style="font-size:88%"|6–1
|-
|Win
|1–1
|align=left| Kojiro Kurimori
|style="font-size:88%"|3–1
|-
|Loss
|0–1
|align=left| Shikhsaid Dzhalilov
|style="font-size:88%"|2–5
|-

NCAA record 

! colspan="8"| NCAA Championships Matches
|-
!  Res.
!  Record
!  Opponent
!  Score
!  Date
!  Event
|-
! style=background:white colspan=6 |2019 NCAA Championships  at 141 lbs
|-
|Loss
|17–5
|align=left| Yianni Diakomihalis
|style="font-size:88%"|SV–1 4–6
|style="font-size:88%" rowspan=5|March 20–22, 2019
|style="font-size:88%" rowspan=5|2019 NCAA Division I National Championships
|-
|Win
|17–4
|align=left| Nick Lee
|style="font-size:88%"|4–3
|-
|Win
|16–4
|align=left| Mitch McKee
|style="font-size:88%"|MD 11–1
|-
|Win
|15–4
|align=left| Kaid Brock
|style="font-size:88%"|MD 14–1
|-
|Win
|14–4
|align=left| Grant Willits 
|style="font-size:88%"|TF 20–5
|-
! style=background:white colspan=6 |2018 NCAA Championships  at 141 lbs
|-
|Win
|13–4
|align=left| Jaydin Eierman
|style="font-size:88%"|7–2
|style="font-size:88%" rowspan=6|March 15–17, 2018
|style="font-size:88%" rowspan=6|2018 NCAA Division I National Championships
|-
|Win
|12–4
|align=left| Kevin Jack
|style="font-size:88%"|4–3
|-
|Loss
|11–4
|align=left| Bryce Meredith
|style="font-size:88%"|0–1
|-
|Win
|11–3
|align=left| Tyler Smith
|style="font-size:88%"|8–3
|-
|Win
|10–3
|align=left| Luke Karam
|style="font-size:88%"|TF 15–0
|-
|Win
|9–3
|align=left| Alex Madrigal
|style="font-size:88%"|TF 16–1
|-
! style=background:white colspan=6 |2017 NCAA Championships DNP at 141 lbs
|-
|Loss
|8–3
|align=left| Jaydin Eierman
|style="font-size:88%"|MD 0–8
|style="font-size:88%" rowspan=5|March 16–18, 2017
|style="font-size:88%" rowspan=5|2017 NCAA Division I National Championships
|-
|Win
|8–2
|align=left| Randy Cruz 
|style="font-size:88%"|4–3
|-
|Win
|7–2
|align=left| Ryan Diehl
|style="font-size:88%"|MD 9–0
|-
|Loss
|6–2
|align=left| Thomas Thorn
|style="font-size:88%"|Fall
|-
|Win
|6–1
|align=left| Dylan Caruana 
|style="font-size:88%"|6–0
|-
! style=background:white colspan=6 |2016 NCAA Championships  at 141 lbs
|-
|Win
|5–1
|align=left| Anthony Ashnault
|style="font-size:88%"|7–6
|style="font-size:88%" rowspan=6|March 17–19, 2016
|style="font-size:88%" rowspan=6|2016 NCAA Division I National Championships
|-
|Win
|4–1
|align=left| Chris Mecate 
|style="font-size:88%"|3–1
|-
|Loss
|3–1
|align=left| Bryce Meredith 
|style="font-size:88%"|3–5
|-
|Win
|3–0
|align=left| Solomon Chishko
|style="font-size:88%"|6–1
|-
|Win
|2–0
|align=left| Brock Zacherl
|style="font-size:88%"|4–2
|-
|Win
|1–0
|align=left| Zachary Horan
|style="font-size:88%"|TB–1 2–1
|-

Stats 

!  Season
!  Year
!  School
!  Rank
!  Weigh Class
!  Record
!  Win
!  Bonus
|-
|2019
|Senior
|rowspan=2|Ohio State University
|#3 (2nd)
|rowspan=4|141
|24–3
|88.89%
|55.56%
|-
|2018
|Junior
|#4 (3rd)
|21–2
|91.30%
|39.13%
|-
|2017
|Sophomore
|rowspan=2|Stanford University
|#7 (DNP)
|32–3
|91.43%
|51.43%
|-
|2016
|Freshman
|#4 (3rd)
|28–3
|90.32%
|45.16%
|-
|colspan=5 bgcolor="LIGHTGREY"|Career
|bgcolor="LIGHTGREY"|105–11
|bgcolor="LIGHTGREY"|90.52%
|bgcolor="LIGHTGREY"|49.14%

References 

Living people
1995 births
People from Ridgewood, New Jersey
American male sport wrestlers
Pan American Wrestling Championships medalists
Stanford University alumni
Stanford Cardinal wrestlers
Ohio State University alumni
Ohio State Buckeyes wrestlers
Blair Academy alumni
20th-century American people
21st-century American people